Ivy Burne, also known as the John Murchison Hodges, Sr. House, is a historic home and farm complex and national historic district located near Linden, Harnett County, North Carolina. It encompasses eight contributing buildings and one contributing site on a rural farm complex.  The farmhouse was built in stages between 1872 and 1910, and is a two-story, vernacular Italianate / Queen Anne frame dwelling.  It features a shallow, hip roofed front porch. Also on the property are a board-and-batten kitchen, a plank smokehouse, a log corn crib and tobacco barn and a frame generator house.

It was listed on the National Register of Historic Places in 1991.

References

Farms on the National Register of Historic Places in North Carolina
Historic districts on the National Register of Historic Places in North Carolina
Italianate architecture in North Carolina
Queen Anne architecture in North Carolina
Houses completed in 1910
Buildings and structures in Harnett County, North Carolina
National Register of Historic Places in Harnett County, North Carolina